Hathut Records is a Swiss record company and label founded by Werner Xavier Uehlinger in 1974 that specializes in jazz and classical music. The name of the label comes from the artwork of Klaus Baumgartner. Hathut encompasses the labels hat ART, hatOLOGY, and hat NOIR.

The label's first releases were by Joe McPhee. Its roster includes Ray Anderson, Anthony Braxton, Lisle Ellis, Georg Graewe, Gerry Hemingway, Franz Koglmann, Steve Lacy, Joelle Leandre, Myra Melford, Paul Plimley, Max Roach, Horace Tapscott, Cecil Taylor, Mike Westbrook, John Zorn, Vienna Art Orchestra, David Murray, Luzia von Wyl, Archie Shepp, Jimmy Lyons, Tony Coe, Michel Portal, and Sun Ra,

The label progressed through a range of series featuring distinct packaging styles, from the initial runs of initial 12 inch LP's with alphabetical and numerical catalog numbers with sleeve drawings and paintings by Klaus Baumgärtner, to elaborately packaged boxes with inserts and postcards, and then black and white photography on CD releases.

From 1985 until 2000 the label received funding from the Swiss Bank Corporation. Its catalogue was acquired by the Belgian music publisher Outhere Music in 2017.

Discography

HatHut "ABC" Series
Werner X. Uehlinger started the HatHut label in 1975 to release recordings by Joe McPhee and soon followed with albums by emerging avant-garde jazz musicians including Steve Lacy, David Murray, David S. Ware and Jimmy Lyons. The first releases on HatHut between 1975 and 1979 had alphabetic catalog numbers starting with A and ending with a triple LP Y/Z/Z making a total of twenty albums in the series.

HatHut Numeric "R0" Series
From 1980 to 1981, following the last alphabetic catalog number, HatHut releases had a written numeric catalog number followed by a bracketed "RO" code where the first digit of the code indicated a single ("1RO"), double ("2RO") or triple ("3RO") LP. A total of 22 albums were released in this series.

Hat MUSICS Series
From 1981 to 1983 Hathut released a series of seventeen albums on the hat MUSICS label.

HatHut hat ART discography: LPs
From 1981 to 1987 Hathut released a total of fifty-one albums in the initial hat ART LP series, many of which were packaged in fold-open cardboard box like sleeves which sometimes included postcards, additional 45rpm  EPs, 7" singles, or single sided albums.

HatHut hatART discography: CDs
Hathut began releasing compact discs on the hat ART label in 1988 with a 6000 series catalog numbers featuring new music and reissues of vinyl albums, sometimes with additional material. The series featured 201 releases and concluded in 1997 when the hatART label was replaced by two labels: hatOLOGY for jazz releases and hat(new)ART for classical music.

HatHut hatOLOGY discography: CDs
From 1997 hatOLOGY has been the main label for HatHut releases releasing new recordings and reissues, occasionally edited or expanded, of music from the early HatHut catalogue.

See also
 List of record labels

References

Further reading
Profile at AllAboutJazz
Profile at DownBeat

External links
 Official site

Classical music record labels
Jazz record labels
Record labels established in 1975
Spoken word record labels
Swiss record labels